is a Japanese manga written by Mako Komao and illustrated by Mizuo Shinonome (characters) and Reine Hibiki (scenario) which was first serialized in the now-defunct yuri josei manga magazine Yuri Shimai on June 28, 2003 under the title . The manga was transferred to Comic Yuri Hime, Yuri Shimai'''s successor, published by Ichijinsha.  The final chapter was published in the eleventh issue of Comic Yuri Hime, and three bound volumes have been released, with the final one on April 18, 2008. The manga has been licensed by Los Angeles-based company Seven Seas Entertainment and the first volume went on sale in January 2008, but the series is now on hold due to rights issues. Three drama CDs based on this series have been released, the first two under the title Koi Shimai and the third under the title Hatsukoi Shimai''.

Plot
During a visit to Tsunojo Girls' Academy, Chika Matsuzato meets the girl of her dreams, cool upperclassman Haruna Kizaki. Even though they spent only one short day together, Chika will never forget Haruna's kindness, and has made it her life's goal to study hard and get accepted into Tsunojo Girls' School so that they can be together. However, things do not go as smoothly as Chika had planned when she finally arrives.

Characters

A cheerful and energetic girl, Chika is shown around Tsunokamizaka Girls' Academy by Haruna, and decides to apply there in order to see Haruna again. She gets easily depressed when she can't understand Haruna's feelings, or feels she has made some kind of mistake.

A cool upperclassman, she meets Chika when giving her a tour around the school. Haruna uses her handkerchief to clean Chika's wound when she falls over, prompting Chika to promise to return it when she enters the school. Haruna was previously in a relationship with an upperclassman which did not end well, leaving her unsure about new relationships.

Chika's classmate and friend, she is always looking out for her. She is Haruna's younger sister.

Drama CD cast
 Chika Matsuzato - Mai Nakahara
 Haruna Kizaki - Saeko Chiba
 Akiho Kizaki - Ai Nonaka
 Touko Hiiragi - Romi Park
 Kirika - Rina Satō
 Miyu - Sayaka Ohara

References

Further reading

External links
Seven Seas Entertainment's First Love Sisters official website

Advocate article

2003 manga
Drama audio recordings
Ichijinsha manga
Josei manga
Romance anime and manga
School life in anime and manga
Seven Seas Entertainment titles
Yuri (genre) anime and manga
2000s LGBT literature